Anamdas Ka Potha is a Hindi novel, written by an Indian Hindi writer Hazari Prasad Dwivedi. This novel's genre is love story and published by Rajkamal Prakashan.

References

Hindi-language novels
Indian romance novels